The Home Department (Hindi: गृह विभाग) is a department of Government of Bihar. It plays a key role in maintenance of administration in the state of Bihar. The department oversees the maintenance of law and order, prevention and control of crime, prosecution of criminals besides dealing with Fire Services and Prisons Administration. It is the nodal department for the State Secretariat Service and is also responsible for the functioning of State Police and Home Guards Services. The department is also the cadre controlling authority of Indian Police Service (IPS) (Bihar Cadre) and Bihar Police Service (BPS). The Chief Minister generally serves as the departmental minister, and the Principal Secretary (Home), an IAS officer, is the administrative head of the department.

Functions 

The Home Department is responsible for maintenance of internal security and enforcement of law and order in the state of Bihar. The department also oversees the functioning of State Police, Home Guards, Fire Services, Prisons & Correctional Services. The department answers the questions in the Legislative Assembly/Legislative Council, addresses the issues related to the affairs of the State Human Rights Commission, and National Human Rights Commission. The department also keeps a close liaison with Defense Services of Military and Civil Co-operation and for setting up of defense projects in the State. It also coordinates police and law and order related matters with the Ministry of Home Affairs, Government of India.

The department ensures the security arrangements of citizens, VIPs and state guests and also is the cadre controlling authority of Indian Police Service, and Bihar Police Service.

Organizational structure 

The Chief Minister of Bihar, Nitish Kumar, is the minister responsible for Department of Home.

The department is headed by the Principal Secretary rank IAS officer. The Principal Secretary is assisted by 2 Secretaries, 2 Special Secretaries, 2 Additional Secretaries, 3 Joint Secretaries and 1 Under Secretary. The department is broadly divided into 3 branches – Special Section, Police Section and Prison Section.

References 

Government of Bihar
Law enforcement agencies in Asia
Government Departments of Bihar
Year of establishment missing